is a Japanese light novel series written by Yomi Hirasaka and illustrated by Kantoku. Shogakukan has published 14 novels since March 2015 under their Gagaga Bunko imprint. Two manga adaptations have been published by Shogakukan and Square Enix. An anime television series adaptation by Silver Link premiered on October 8, 2017.

Plot
The story follows the novelist Itsuki Hashima who is surrounded by various people, including a beautiful genius writer who loves him, a big-sisterly college classmate, a fellow male writer, a sadistic tax accountant, and his editor. As the story progresses, the underlying conflicts of dreams and goals surface, as each character attempts to achieve their dreams, in their own way. One such example is the rivalry between author Itsuki and his friend Haruto. Itsuki's stories are driven by a passion for stories about little sisters with praise from a selective yet strongly supportive fan-base, whereas Haruto's stories are driven by victory and romance through more common, yet popular cliches. Each of their stories are riddled with common light novel themes and concepts, such as romantic comedy elements and erotic illustrations. They are all looked after by Itsuki's younger "brother" Chihiro, who in fact is his younger stepsister.

Characters

Itsuki is a 20-year-old author who has an obsession towards younger sisters. He is a novelist who debuted when he was in high school; all of his novels feature younger sisters as the heroine. In the span of five years, he has published 20 books, some of which have ranked in the top 10 weekly rankings for light novels on Oricon. Despite his success, his irrational personality and writing style has led to mediocre ratings compared to his fellow writers. His relationship with his father became worse when his father remarried to Chihiro's mother only three years after Itsuki's mother died. Towards the end of the series, he proposed to Nayuta. The series ends with him being married to Nayuta and them having a son named Sora.

Chihiro appears as Itsuki's younger stepbrother, but Chihiro is actually a girl. She is a dependable person who looks after everyone around her. The reason why she hides her real gender is because their father thought she was in danger when he found out about Itsuki's obsession during his novel debut. She hides her true identity only in front of Itsuki and his acquaintances. Her main hobby throughout the series is housekeeping. Her true identity as a girl is revealed between volume 9 and volume 10, after an unintentional insult made by Nayuta.
 

Nayuta is an 18-year-old genius novelist who debuted after she won a newcomer prize. Nayuta Kani is her pseudonym and at first even Itsuki does not know her real name. She cannot write if she is not naked, has a slight obsession with personal nudity, and she likes dirty jokes. Starting in junior high school, she refused to go to school after getting bullied. After reading Itsuki's novel, she falls in love with him and will not hesitate to show it. She is also part-Russian. At the end of the series, she is married to Itsuki and is pregnant with their second child.

Miyako is Itsuki's classmate at college who at first had a bad first impression towards him. While Miyako does not understand Itsuki's stories, she became his fashion advisor to help him with his novel. After Itsuki dropped out college, Miyako still comes to see him. She has feelings for Itsuki but decided to support Nayuta instead. She is good friends with Nayuta and seems to be getting dragged into the latter's obsession with personal nudity.

Haruto is another novelist who debuted around the same time as Itsuki. Despite his cool appearance, he loves maid characters and owns a lot of adult games and figurines. Haruto has a "persona" in his social media to gain fans for his novel and to increase his series' popularity. He has a younger sister whom he thought is harsh to him, but is actually a sister who cannot be honest. His light novel series got a poorly-adapted anime because it was used as tool for newcomer voice actors with no ability. In the middle of his shock, Miyako encouraged him and his hard work. He gained a crush on Miyako, however he found out her feelings for Itsuki and decided to "keep going on his pace."

Setsuna is a 16-year-old illustrator who goes under the pen name . Setsuna was in charge of illustrating Itsuki's novels until Itsuki decided to stop because he thought his series is not worthy enough for Setsuna's art and asked him to wait until he is worthy enough. He dresses in Harajuku fashion and has an easygoing personality, even on deadlines. He has a butt fetish.

Ashley is a 32-year-old tax accountant who wears lolita fashion. She is reliable but sadistic; she makes her clients reveal their fetishes through their expenses, but raises their tax return in exchange. She is currently the only one among Itsuki's acquaintances who knows about Chihiro's real identity.

Kenjiro is an editor at GF Bunko who is in charge of Itsuki's works. He looks like a typical office worker and is often seen drunk when overly stressed with his job, particularly when it comes to Itsuki and Setsuna's deadlines.

Kaiko is an artist who is in charge of adapting Itsuki's novel  ( in the anime) into a manga. Her drawing skill level is so high that Itsuki becomes moved after seeing her works, despite her being a newcomer. She has an underwear fetish and refuses to draw a completely naked person, however then later changes her mind thanks to Nayuta. The ribbon she wears on her head is actually a pair of panties; she will wear them on her face before she draws.

Media

Light novels
A Sister's All You Need is written by Yomi Hirasaka and illustrated by Kantoku. Shogakukan published the first volume on March 18, 2015, under their Gagaga Bunko imprint. The limited editions of volumes 4 and 7 include a drama CD. Yen Press have licensed the novels in North America. The English version is translated by Kevin Gifford. The series is also published in Taiwan by Tong Li Publishing.

Manga
A manga adaptation, titled Imōto Sae Ireba Ii. @comic and illustrated by Idu, was serialized in Shogakukan's Monthly Sunday Gene-X magazine from December 19, 2015, to July 19, 2019. Shogakukan collected its chapters in nine tankōbon volumes, released from May 19, 2016, to October 18, 2019.

A spin-off manga, titled  and illustrated by Kobashiko, was serialized in Square Enix's Gangan Joker from October 22, 2016, to February 22, 2018.

Anime
An anime television series adaptation, directed by Shin Oonuma and produced by Silver Link, aired from October 8 to December 24, 2017. Author Yomi Hirasaka wrote the scripts, Sumie Kinoshita designed the characters, and Tomoki Kikuya composed the music. The opening theme song  was performed by ChouCho, while the ending theme song  was performed by Aira Yūki. Crunchyroll streamed the series with Funimation streaming a simuldub. Following Sony's acquisition of Crunchyroll, the series was moved to Crunchyroll. Muse Communication licensed the series in South and Southeast Asia.

A short anime series titled  is streamed online through the anime's official Twitter account following the broadcast of the anime television series. Each episode is two minutes long with super deformed characters. Kenshiro Morii serves as the director.

See also 
 Haganai – a light novel series by the same author

Explanatory notes

References

External links 
  at Gagaga Bunko 
 
 

2017 anime television series debuts
2015 Japanese novels
Anime and manga based on light novels
Crunchyroll anime
Gagaga Bunko
Gangan Comics manga
Light novels
Muse Communication
Romantic comedy anime and manga
Seinen manga
Shogakukan manga
Shōnen manga
Silver Link
Television shows set in Tokyo
Yen Press titles